Carol Denison Frost (born 23 May 1957) is an American isotope geologist, petrologist and professor. Her primary research focuses on the evolution of the continental crust and granite petrogenesis. She has spent over thirty-five years investigating the geologic history of the Wyoming Province and the formation and geochemical classification of granite. Other contributions include isotopic fingerprinting of natural waters, including water associated with energy production. She served as Director of the Earth Sciences Division, National Science Foundation, from December 2014 to January 2018.

Early life

Frost grew up in Anchorage, Alaska. Prior to the 1964 Alaska earthquake her family home was four blocks from Cook Inlet; afterwards it was only two. This experience of the dynamic Earth led her to study geology at Dartmouth College, where she completed an undergraduate honors thesis in the Salt Range of northern Pakistan. She earned the PhD at the University of Cambridge in 1984. Her dissertation, using isotopic tracers to investigate sediment provenance and granite petrogenesis, underscored the important role of crustal recycling in the geochemical evolution of the continental crust.

Career

Frost joined the University of Wyoming as an assistant professor in 1983, rising through the ranks and becoming professor in 1995. Frost held a number of administrative positions, first at the University of Wyoming and then at the National Science Foundation. From 2006 to 2007, she was founding director of the School of Energy Resources at UW. She then served as Associate Vice President for Research (2008-2010), Vice President for Special Projects (2010-2012), and Associate Provost (2012-2013). In 2014 she became Division Director for the Division of Earth Sciences at the National Science Foundation, a position she held until returning to the University of Wyoming in early 2018.

Frost is the 101st President of the Mineralogical Society of America (2020).

Research 
Frost's research involves studying how the continental crust has changed throughout history, and, due to the vastness of this topic, she works with a multitude of rocks, including igneous, metamorphic, and sedimentary (from the Archaean period to today) as well as water and materials such as coal and crude oils.  She focuses especially on the Precambrian continental crust in Wyoming, and is currently researching in the Teton Range, where she is looking at what she describes to be “the oldest high-pressure metamorphism in North America” (Frost, n.d., Research Statement, para. 2) in order to take note of a historical collision between continents. This area of research is being completed alongside Susan Swapp and Ronald Frost.

In the Blue Mountains of Oregon, with research partners Art Snoke and Jason Mailloux (PhD student), she is also currently looking at sediment recycling with Nd isotopes, as well as the movements of sediments within a river (with Jason Mailloux).

Frost's research in Wyoming has found that various groundwater aquifers are made up of unique Sr isotopic compositions, and therefore, by using Sr isotopic ratios, contamination between aquifers can be identified. In the Powder River Basin of Wyoming, she and her partners have also determined that unique Sr and C isotopic compositions can be found in groundwaters from aquifers made up of sandstone and coal, which can help them to trace and take note of changes in the movement of groundwater caused by dewatering (which is a result of the methane produced from coal beds and surface mining).

She has also acted as a private investigator on projects that stem from research regarding sites of geologic formations for carbon dioxide storage as well as depleted gas fields in southeastern and northeastern Wyoming, respectively. These projects provide the instruction needed for the “injection and storage of carbon dioxide in deep saline aquifer and depleted oil and gas fields” (Frost, n.d., Research Statement, para. 5).

Awards and honors
2019 Fellow, Geological Society of America
2018 Inaugural Chappell Lecturer, Australian National University
2016 Geochemistry Fellow, Geochemical Society and European Association of Geochemistry
2013 National Ski Patrol Purple Merit Star
2008 George Duke Humphrey Award, University of Wyoming
2007 Chosen “Top Ten Teacher” by UW College of Arts & Sciences students 
2004 Honorary Member Phi Beta Kappa 
2001 Carnegie Foundation/CASE Wyoming Professor of the Year
2000-2001 Ellbogen Meritorious Classroom Teaching Award, University of Wyoming 
Fall 2000 Presidential Award, University of Wyoming
1998 Fellow, Mineralogical Society of America
1990 Visiting Fellow, Clare Hall, Cambridge

Writings
2013 "Proterozoic ferroan feldspathic magmatism" Carol D. Frost, B. Ronald Frost 
2008 "A Geochemical Classification for Feldspathic Igneous Rocks" B. Ronald Frost, Carol D. Frost 
2006 "Archean geochronological framework of the Bighorn Mountains, Wyoming" Carol D Frost, C Mark Fanning 
2003 "Early Archean to Mesoproterozoic evolution of the Wyoming Province: Archean origins to modern lithospheric architecture" Carol D. Frost, B. Ronald Frost, Kevin R. Chamberlain

References

American geologists
Women geologists
University of Wyoming faculty
Alumni of the University of Cambridge
1957 births
People from Oregon
Women geochemists
American women geologists
Dartmouth College alumni
Living people
American women academics
21st-century American women
Scientists from Alaska
People from Anchorage, Alaska